Action Philosophers! was a self-published comic book series by artist Ryan Dunlavey and writer Fred Van Lente, which was awarded a Xeric Grant in 2004, leading to Action Philosophers! # 1's publication in April 2005.

The series focused on a concise biography of some of the most notable philosophers and their ideas.  To quote the  book's homepage:

ACTION PHILOSOPHERS! is a comic book series detailing the lives and thoughts of history's A-list brain trust in a hip and humorous way that proves that philosophy is not just the province of boring tweed-enveloped college professors.

The series concluded with issue # 9, published in September 2007. The series was also collected into various self-published paperback collections. Dark Horse Comics published a deluxe hardcover collection of the series with new material in October, 2014.

Reception
The American Library Association included Action Philosophers vol. 1 in its 2007 Great Graphic Novels for Teens booklist. The series was nominated for a 2007 Ignatz Outstanding Debut Award and received a positive review from Philosophy Now.

Issue summary
 # 1:  - Nietzsche, Bodhidharma, & Plato: "Wrestling Superstar of Ancient Greece!", featuring one of the series' most famous lines, "PLATO SMASH!"
 # 2:  - The "All Sex Special", featuring Ayn Rand, Thomas Jefferson, & Saint Augustine.
 # 3:  - "Self Help for Stupid Ugly Losers" featuring Sigmund Freud, Carl Jung, & Joseph Campbell.
 # 4:  - "World Domination Handbook" featuring Karl Marx, Niccolò Machiavelli, & The Kabbalah.
 # 5:  - "Hate the French" featuring René Descartes, Jean-Paul Sartre, & Jacques Derrida.
 # 6:  - "The People's Choice" featuring Soren Kierkegaard, St. Thomas Aquinas, & Ludwig Wittgenstein.
 # 7:  - "It's all Greek to you" featuring The Pre-Socratics, Aristotle, & Epictetus.
 # 8:  - "Senseless Violence Special" featuring Kant, Schopenhauer, Hegel, & John Stuart Mill.
 # 9:  - "The Lightning Round", the final issue featuring Diogenes the Cynic, Lao Tzu, Michel Foucault, David Hume, Confucius, George Berkeley, Francis Bacon,  Jean-Jacques Rousseau, Thomas Hobbes, Mary Wollstonecraft, Baruch Spinoza and Gottfried Leibniz.

Collected editions

References

External links
Official series website, featuring free issue previews
Interview with Fred and Ryan at comiXology on Action Philosophers and Comic Book Comics
BamKaPow.com's interview, also examining the creative team's post-AP! projects
 Official Action Philosophers! message board
Philosophy Now's review
Interview with Indie Comics News
HollywoodJesus.com Review 

2005 comics debuts
2007 comics endings
Comics magazines published in the United States
Philosophical literature
Humor comics
Biographical comics
Satirical comics
Educational comics
Comics based on real people
Cultural depictions of philosophers
Cultural depictions of Friedrich Nietzsche
Cultural depictions of Ayn Rand
Cultural depictions of Sigmund Freud
Cultural depictions of Carl Jung
Cultural depictions of Karl Marx
Cultural depictions of Niccolò Machiavelli
Cultural depictions of Aristotle
Cultural depictions of Diogenes
Cultural depictions of Laozi
Cultural depictions of Confucius
Cultural depictions of Plato
Cultural depictions of Thomas Jefferson
Cultural depictions of Baruch Spinoza
Cultural depictions of René Descartes